Trunis, a village in Goghtn Region of Armenia, currently included into Ordubad region of Nakhchivan autonomy of Azerbaijan.

The village has gardens, a number of marks of old time constructions, ruins of several churches, caravanserais and other constructions. There is a rock near the village considered a place for pilgrimage.

Populated places in Ordubad District